Dancing Stage is a music video game, developed by Konami, released in European arcades on March 9, 1999. In North America, the game was released as Dance Dance Revolution on the same date, and it received a PlayStation port on March 6, 2001. It is the first international release of the game. The arcade version features 13 songs, with 11 of these available on the PlayStation port, while Dancing Stage Internet Ranking adds another three exclusive songs to arcades.

Gameplay
The core gameplay involves the player stepping their feet to correspond with the arrows that appear on screen and the beat. During normal gameplay, arrows scroll upwards from the bottom of the screen and pass over a set of stationary arrows near the top (referred to as the "guide arrows" or "receptors", officially known as the Step Zone). When the scrolling arrows overlap the stationary ones, the player must step on the corresponding arrows on the dance platform, and the player is given a judgement for their accuracy of every streaked note.

Music
All versions include the following songs:

 "AM-3P" by kTz
 "Boom Boom Dollar" by King Kong & D.Jungle Girls
 "Brilliant 2U" by Naoki
 "Brilliant 2U (Orchestra-Groove)" by Naoki
 "Have You Never Been Mellow" by The Olivia Project
 "Make It Better" by mitsu-O!
 "My Fire" by X-Treme
 "PARANOiA" by 180
 "Put Your Faith In Me" by UZI-LAY
 "Put Your Faith In Me (Jazzy Groove)" by UZI-LAY
 "Trip Machine" by De-Sire

"Butterfly" by Smile.dk and "Make It Better (So-Real Mix)" by mitsu-O! are exclusive to the arcade release.

180, kTz, mitsu-O! and UZI-LAY are pen names for Naoki Maeda. Songs with "Groove" or "Mix" in the title require certain criteria to be unlocked by the player.

Dancing Stage Internet Ranking was released exclusively in Europe. It adds another three licensed covers, credited with the original artists:
 "It's Like That" (cover of Run–D.M.C. vs. Jason Nevins)
 "Last Thing On My Mind by Step Ahead (cover of Steps)
 "Uh La La La" by Party All Night (cover of Alexia)

Reception

It was a runner-up for GameSpots annual "Best PlayStation Game" and "Best Music/Rhythm Game" awards, which went to Tony Hawk's Pro Skater 3 and Frequency, respectively.

See also
Dancing Stage
Dance Dance Revolution

References

External links
ddr.sh entry for Dance Dance Revolution 

1999 video games
Arcade video games
Dance Dance Revolution games
PlayStation (console) games
Video games developed in Japan